Themacus or Themakos was a deme of ancient Attica, originally of the phyle of Erechtheis but after 224/223 BCE, the phyle of Ptolemais, sending one delegate to the Athenian Boule.

Its site is unlocated.

References

Populated places in ancient Attica
Former populated places in Greece
Demoi
Lost ancient cities and towns